Roley Young is an Australian former rugby league footballer who played for the Newtown Jets in the New South Wales Rugby League premiership competition.

Background
Young was born in Sydney, New South Wales, Australia.

Playing career
He made his first grade debut during the 1959 NSWRFL season. On 30 May 1959, in a match against the North Sydney Bears, Young kicked five goals. However, later in the season he was dropped in favour of Ron Wright. Newtown finished fourth that season.

During the 1960 NSWRFL season, Young played mostly in reserve grade, and he was passed over by selectors in favour of Wright and John Kenny. He did, however, make appearances as a substitute.

References 

Year of birth missing (living people)
Living people
Australian rugby league players
Rugby league players from Sydney
Newtown Jets players
Rugby league fullbacks